Aziziye, Azizia or Aziziyah (ʿAzīziyye) are place names in Turkish and Arabic. It may refer to:

Places
Aziziye, a district in Erzurum Province, Turkey
Aziziye, Biga
Aziziye, Burdur
Aziziye, Dursunbey, a village
Aziziye, Susurluk, a village
Aziziyah, a neighborhood of Mecca in Makkah Province, Saudi Arabia
‘Aziziya, a city and the capital of the Jafara district, Libya
Aziziyah, Hama, a village located in Al-Hamraa Nahiyah in Hama District, Hama Governorate, Syria
The former name of Emirdağ, Afyonkarahisar Province, Turkey

Other uses
 Ottoman ironclad Aziziye
Panda Retail Company (formerly known as Azizia Panda), a Saudi Arabian grocery retailing company
Aziziye Mosque (Konya), a mosque in Konya, Turkey
Aziziye Mosque (London), a mosque in London, United Kingdom